is a Japanese footballer currently playing as a forward.

Club statistics

Notes

References

1989 births
Living people
Japanese footballers
Japanese expatriate footballers
Association football people from Tokyo
Association football forwards
Japanese expatriate sportspeople in Thailand
Expatriate footballers in Thailand
Japanese expatriate sportspeople in Australia
Expatriate soccer players in Australia
Japanese expatriate sportspeople in India
Expatriate footballers in India
I-League players
Tokyo Verdy players
Sydney Olympic FC players
RoundGlass Punjab FC players